Solved may refer to:

Solved (TV series)
Solved (album), an album by MC Frontalot
Solved (EP), an EP by Svoy
solved game

See also
Solution (disambiguation)
Resolution (disambiguation)
Unsolved (disambiguation)